Harry Eden Godby (2 July 1847 – 1911) was a New Zealand cricketer. He played two first-class matches for Otago between 1874 and 1876.

Godby was born in England at Ramsgate in Kent in 1847, the son of a Church of England priest. He was educated at Marlborough College in Wiltshire. His brother, Michael Godby, also played cricket for Otago. Godby died in Australia in 1911.

References

External links
 

1847 births
1911 deaths
New Zealand cricketers
Otago cricketers
People from Ramsgate
Sportspeople from Kent